Ripple is a village and civil parish in the county of Worcestershire, England. Ripple is one of the most southerly parishes in the county and is situated on the A38 road with the River Severn as its western boundary. Together with the villages and hamlets of Ryall, Holly Green, The Grove, Naunton, and Uckinghall, the parish has a combined population  of 1,799.

Ripple is a ward of Malvern Hills District, returning one member to the Council. The ward consists of the parishes of Ripple, Earls Croome and Hill Croome.

History

 
Ripple is mentioned in passing in the Domesday Book of 1086, under the entry of Upton upon Severn, as being "also held by the Bishop of Worcester". During the English Civil War Ripple was the site of a Royalist victory, the Battle of Ripple Field, on 13 April 1643. After an initial Parliamentarian attack by cavalry which was repulsed, the Parliamentarians retreated back into the village of Ripple. After a brief stand, they were eventually routed by the royalist cavalry of Prince Maurice (Maurice of the Palatinate).

St Mary's Church is a Grade I listed building with "exceptional" 15th-century stalls with 16 carved misericords.

Railways
Ripple railway station was on the Tewkesbury and Malvern Railway on the Midland Railway (later LMS) branch line from Ashchurch to Great Malvern, which ran via Tewkesbury, Ripple, Upton-upon-Severn and Malvern Wells. This was opened from Ashchurch as far as Tewkesbury on 21 July 1840 and extended to Malvern on 16 May 1864. It was closed beyond Upton-on-Severn railway station on 1 December 1952 and the rest (including Ripple) on 14 August 1961. Ripple station still stands, attractively restored, and is now a private house.

See also
 Lordship of Saxons Lode

References

External links

 Ripple Council official website

Villages in Worcestershire
Civil parishes in Worcestershire